This is the complete list of Olympic medalists in freestyle wrestling.

Current program

Men

Bantamweight
 56.70 kg: 1904
 54 kg: 1908
 56 kg: 1924–1936
 57 kg: 1948–1996
 58 kg: 2000
 55 kg: 2004–2012
 57 kg: 2016–present

Lightweight
 −65.77 kg (1904)
 −66.6 kg (1908)
 −67.5 kg (1920–1936)
 −67 kg (1948–1960)
 −70 kg (1964–1968)
 −68 kg (1972–1996)
 −69 kg (2000)
 −66 kg (2004–2012)
 −65 kg (2016–present)

Welterweight
 −71.67 kg (1904)
 −72 kg (1924–1936)
 −73 kg (1948–1960)
 −78 kg (1964–1968)
 −74 kg (1972–1996)
 −76 kg (2000)
 −74 kg (2004–present)

Middleweight
 −73 kg (1908)
 −75 kg (1920)
 −75 kg (1924–1960)
 −87 kg (1964–1968)
 −82 kg (1972–1996)
 −85 kg (2000)
 −84 kg (2004–2012)
 −86 kg (2016–present)

Heavyweight
+71.67 kg (1904)
+73 kg (1908)
+82.5 kg (1920)
+87 kg (1924–1960)
+97 kg  (1964–1968)
 −100 kg (1972–1996)
 −97 kg (2000)
 −96 kg (2004–2012)
 −97 kg (2016–present)

Super heavyweight
+100 kg  (1972–1984)
 −130 kg (1988–2000)
 −120 kg (2004–2012)
 −125 kg (2016–present)

Women

Flyweight
 48 kg: 2004–2016
 50 kg: 2020–present

Bantamweight
 53 kg: 2016–present

Lightweight
 55 kg: 2004–2012
 58 kg: 2016
 57 kg: 2020–present

Middleweight
 63 kg: 2004–2016
 62 kg: 2020–present

Light heavyweight
 69 kg: 2016
 68 kg: 2020–present

Heavyweight
 72 kg: 2004–2012
 75 kg: 2016
 76 kg: 2020–present

Discontinued events

Men

Light flyweight
 47.6 kg: 1904
 48 kg: 1972–1996

Flyweight
 52.16 kg: 1904
 52 kg: 1948–1996
 54 kg: 2000

Featherweight
 61.33 kg: 1904
 60.30 kg: 1908
 61 kg: 1920–1936
 63 kg: 1948–1968
 62 kg: 1972–1996
 63 kg: 2000
 60 kg: 2004–2012

Light heavyweight 
 80 kg: 1920
 87 kg: 1924–1960
 97 kg: 1964–1968
 90 kg: 1972–1996

See also
List of Asian Games medalists in wrestling
List of World and Olympic Champions in men's freestyle wrestling

References
International Olympic Committee results database

Wrestling Freestyle
medalists
Freestyle wrestling

Olympic freestyle